Perfluorosulfonic acids (PFSAs) are chemical compounds of the formula CnF(2n+1)SO3H and thus belong to the family of perfluorinated and polyfluorinated alkyl compounds (PFASs). The simplest example of a perfluorosulfonic acid is the trifluoromethanesulfonic acid. Perfluorosulfonic acids with six or more perfluorinated carbon atoms, i.e. from perfluorohexanesulfonic acid onwards, are referred to as long-chain.

Properties 
Perfluorosulfonic acids are organofluoroanalogues of conventional alkanesulfonic acids, but they are several pKA units stronger (and are therefore strong acids). Their perfluoroalkyl chain has a highly hydrophobic character.

Use 
Perfluorooctanesulfonic acid, for example, has been used in hard chromium plating.

Regulation 
Perfluorooctanesulfonic acid was included in Annex B of the Stockholm Convention in 2009 and subsequently in the EU POPs Regulation.

Perfluorohexanesulfonic acid including its salts and related compounds was proposed for inclusion in the Stockholm Convention.

Examples

Literature

References